The governor of Misamis Occidental, is the chief executive of the provincial government of Misamis Occidental.

Provincial Governors (1987-2025)

References

Governors of Misamis Occidental
Misamis Occidental